Chi Zhongguo is a Chinese footballer of Korean ethnicity who currently plays as a midfielder for Beijing Guoan in the Chinese Super League.

Club career
Chi decided to turn professional after he graduated from Yanbian No.1 Middle School in 2008. After failing to join Beijing Institute of Technology, he signed a contract with hometown club Yanbian FC. On 29 March 2009, he made his senior debut in a 2–1 away defeat against Shanghai East Asia, coming on as a substitute for Han Songfeng in 73rd minute. On 25 October 2009, he scored his first goal for Yanbian, which ensured Yanbian beat Anhui Jiufang 2–0. Chi gradually became the regular starter in the club and was issued the number 10 jersey in 2013. On 27 July 2013, he made his 100th appearance for Yanbian in a league match against Tianjin Songjiang.

On 4 January 2015, Chi moved to Chinese Super League side Shanghai Shenxin on a free transfer. He made his Super League debut on 8 March 2015, in the first match of the season against Shanghai Greenland Shenhua, coming on as a substitute for Yang Jiawei. He scored his first Super League goal in 57th minute of this match, however, Shanghai Shenxin finally lost to Shanghai Greenland Shenhua 6–2.

On 2 February 2016, Chi returned to Yanbian Funde who newly promoted to the Chinese Super League after Shanghai Shenxin's relegation. He played two season for Yanbian, scoring two goals in 53 appearances and transferred to Super League side Beijing Guoan on 1 January 2018 after Yanbian Funde were relegated to the China League One. At Beijing he would go on to make his debut in a league game on 11 March 2018 against Jiangsu Suning in a 2-1 victory. Chi would establish himself as an integral member of the team and go on to win his first piece of silverware with the 2018 Chinese FA Cup against Shandong Luneng Taishan.

International career
On 10 January 2017, Chi made his debut for the Chinese national team at the 2017 China Cup against Iceland.

Career statistics

Club
Statistics accurate as of match played 31 January 2023.

International

Honours

Club
Beijing Guoan
Chinese FA Cup: 2018.

References

External links
 
 

1989 births
Living people
People from Yanbian
Chinese footballers
Footballers from Jilin
Chinese people of Korean descent
Beijing Guoan F.C. players
Yanbian Funde F.C. players
Shanghai Shenxin F.C. players
Chinese Super League players
China League One players
China international footballers
Association football midfielders
2019 AFC Asian Cup players